In 1909, although cyclists were able to register for the Tour with a sponsor, they were still considered to be riding as individuals. In the 1910 Tour de France, they competed for the first time in teams.

The cyclists were not so enthusiastic about the inclusion of the Pyrenées, and there were less participants: 110 instead of 150 in 1909. There were three teams with 10 cyclists each, including all the favourites for the overall victory: Alcyon, Le Globe and Legnano. The French team "La Française" decided not to join, but allowed their cyclists to ride for the Italian Legnano team. The other 80 cyclists rode as individuals, this was called the "isolés" category.

Cyclists

By starting number

By nationality

References

1910 Tour de France
1910